This is a list of Members of Parliament (MPs) elected to the House of Commons of the United Kingdom by Northern Irish constituencies for the 57th Parliament of the United Kingdom (2017 to 2019). There are 18 such constituencies, 11 of which are represented by Unionists and seven by Nationalists. It includes both MPs elected at the 2017 general election, held on 8 June 2017, and those subsequently elected in by-elections.

The list is sorted by the name of the MP, and MPs who did not serve throughout the Parliament are italicised. New MPs elected since the general election are noted at the bottom of the page.

Sinn Féin MPs follow an abstentionist policy of not taking their seats in the House of Commons.

Current composition

MPs

See also
 2017 United Kingdom general election
 List of MPs elected in the 2017 United Kingdom general election
 List of MPs for constituencies in England (2017–2019)
 List of MPs for constituencies in Scotland (2017–2019)
 List of MPs for constituencies in Wales (2017–2019)
 :Category:UK MPs 2017–2019

References

Northern Ireland
2017
MPs
2010s elections in Northern Ireland